TLW may refer to:

Tavern League of Wisconsin
The Lost World (disambiguation)
True Love Waits (disambiguation)
Tullow Oil, a multinational oil and gas company